Long Hòa may refer to several places in Vietnam, including:

Long Hòa, Cần Thơ, a ward of Bình Thủy District
Long Hòa, Cần Giờ, a commune of Cần Giờ District in Ho Chi Minh City
Long Hòa, Tiền Giang, a commune of Gò Công
Long Hòa, An Giang, a commune of Phú Tân District, An Giang
Long Hòa, Bến Tre, a commune of Bình Đại District
Long Hòa, Bình Dương, a commune of Dầu Tiếng District
Long Hòa, Long An, a commune of Cần Đước District
Long Hòa, Trà Vinh, a commune of Châu Thành District, Trà Vinh